The Black Guest is a 1920 German silent film directed by Wolfgang Neff.

The film's art direction was by Franz Schroedter.

Cast
In alphabetical order

External links

1920 films
Films of the Weimar Republic
Films directed by Wolfgang Neff
German silent feature films
German black-and-white films